Douglas L. Fagerstrom is currently serving as a Senior Discipleship Fellow with The CEO Forum, Flower Mound, Texas (www.theceoforum.org). Fagerstrom was the former President and CEO of Marketplace Chaplains (Marketplace Ministries, Inc.) serving from August 2015 until April 2021.  He was previously the senior vice president of Converge in Orlando, Florida, and previously served as the president of Grand Rapids Theological Seminary of Cornerstone University in Grand Rapids, Michigan.  He is the author of 15 books on Christian ministry. Married to Donna, they have one daughter, son-in-law and two granddaughters.

Education
B.A., Cornerstone University (majors: communication arts and Bible; minors: music and drama; Who's Who in American Universities and Colleges)
M.A. in Religious Education, Bethel Seminary (St. Paul, MN)
D.Min., Northern Baptist Theological Seminary (Chicago). Dissertation: "Creating a Contextual Mentorship in the Local Church."

Succession (Amazon Books, 2020 with Peter Greer)
The Volunteer (Winona Lake: BMH Books, 2009)
The Ministry Staff Member (Grand Rapids: Zondervan, 2006)
Drama in Worship, Vols IV-V (Grand Rapids: Kregel, 2002)
Single to God (Grand Rapids: Kregel, 2001)
Single to Single (Grand Rapids: Kregel, 2000)
Drama in Worship, Vols I-III (Grand Rapids: Kregel, 1999)(Vol I, Book of the Year, 2002)
Baker Handbook of Single Adult Ministry (Grand Rapids: Baker Book House, 1997)
Counseling Single Adults (Grand Rapids: Baker Book House, 1996)
Worship and Drama Library, Vol 14 (Lillenas, 1995)
Single Adult Ministry: The Second Step (Victor Books, 1993)
The Lonely Pew (Grand Rapids: Baker Book House, 1993)
Singles Ministry Handbook (Victor Books, 1988)

Ministry and Teaching Positions
Served in full-time ministry positions since 1973 as a youth pastor, minister of music, single adult pastor, pastor of adult ministries and executive pastor. Churches served: Dalton Baptist Church, MI; Mission Hills Baptist Church, CO; Wooddale Church, MN; Calvary Church, Grand Rapids, MI.

Participated as a keynote speaker and workshop leader at many conferences, retreats, church ministries and Sunday school conventions. Served as adjunct professor at three colleges and one seminary, teaching: discipleship, education, leadership, church planting and creative communication courses. Trained and/or coached over 50 church planters since 2000. Led the Network of Single Adult leaders as Executive Director for 12 years.

Adjunct Faculty, Cornerstone University, 1991-1997; Grand Rapids Theological Seminary, 1999-2003. President of GRTS, 2003 - 2010

Ordination and awards
Ordained in 1982 at Wooddale Church, MN.
A 1989 recipient of the Who's Who in American Christian Leadership
A 1991 recipient of Who's Who in Religion.
2009 Alumni of the Year, Bethel Theological Seminary

References

Year of birth missing (living people)
Living people
American religious writers
American theologians
Cornerstone University alumni